Bromoderma is a skin condition characterized by an eruption of papules and pustules on the skin.  It is caused by hypersensitivity to bromides, such as those found in certain drugs.  There is at least one reported case of bromoderma caused by excessive consumption of a soft drink (Ruby Red Squirt) containing brominated vegetable oil.

See also 
 Skin lesion
 List of cutaneous conditions

References

External links 

Drug eruptions
Bromine